Fire OS is a mobile operating system based on the Android Open Source Project. It is developed by Amazon for their devices. Fire OS includes proprietary software, a customized user interface primarily centered on content consumption, and heavy ties to content available from Amazon's storefronts and services.

History

Amazon began referring to the Android derivative as Fire OS with its third iteration of Fire tablets. Unlike previous Fire models, whose operating system was described as "based on" Android, Fire OS 3.0 was described as "compatible with" Android.

Fire OS 5 
Based on Android 5.1 "Lollipop", it added an updated interface. The home screen has a traditional application grid and pages for content types, as opposed to the previous carousel interface. It also introduced On Deck, a function that automatically moves content out of offline storage to maintain storage space for new content; the Word Runner speed reading tool; and screen color filters. Parental controls were enhanced with a new web browser for FreeTime mode featuring a curated selection of content appropriate for children, and an Activity Center for monitoring children's usage. It removed support for device encryption, which an Amazon spokesperson stated was an enterprise-oriented feature that was underused. In March 2016, after the removal was publicized and criticized in the wake of the FBI–Apple encryption dispute, Amazon announced it would restore the feature in a future patch.

Fire OS 6 
Based on Android 7.1.2 "Nougat", its main changes and additions include:

 Adoptable storage, allowing users to format and use their SD card as internal storage
 Doze/App standby, aiming to improve battery life by forcing devices to sleep when not actively used, adding restrictions to apps that would normally continue to run background processes

MediaTek exploits (2019) 

In early 2019, security exploits for six Fire Tablet models and one Fire TV model were discovered that could allow temporary root access, permanent root access, and bootloader unlocking  due to security vulnerabilities in multiple MediaTek chipsets.

Fire OS 7 

Based on Android 9.0 "Pie", it was released in 2019 for all 8th-11th generation Fire tablets.

In February 2022, Amazon announced that the Docs app would be replaced (in August 2022) by document creation functionality in the Files app; and introduced an improved home editing system.

Fire OS 8 

FireOS 8 is the latest release of FireOS for the 12th generation Fire 7, based on Android 11, information about the release became available via Amazon developer documentation around May 2022.

FireOS 8 incorporates changes from Android 10 and Android 11, although it is noted in the Amazon developer documentation that some Android 11 features such as File Based Encryption (FBE) are not supported yet,

Some of the new changes in FireOS 8 include:

Note: new changes/features (e.g: changes for developers) may be excluded

 Android 10 updates
 TLS 1.3 support enabled by default
 Invoke Setting Panel from within app
 Sharing improvements
 Access to device location in background
 Restrictions on starting activities from the background
 High Efficiency Image File (HEIF) format
 Dark theme

 Android 11 updates
 APK Signature Scheme v2 now required
 One-time permissions

Features
Fire OS does not come with Google mobile services pre-installed; therefore, Amazon cannot use the Android trademarks to market the devices. Users are able to sideload the Google Play store however, full compatibility is not guaranteed if the app depends on Google services.

Because Google services are not pre-installed, Amazon develops and uses its own apps in their place, some of which include Amazon Appstore, Amazon Alexa, Prime Video, Amazon Music, Audible, Kindle Store, Silk Browser, Goodreads and Here WeGo.

Fire OS uses a customized home screen (launcher). As of Fire OS 7.3.2.3, the launcher features three sections:

 "For You" shows the weather, recently used apps, Alexa integration, then shows recommended content such as apps, books movies, etc.
 "Home" is the section for the icons of all of the apps currently installed on the device, apps on the Home section can be moved around or put into folders, a search bar is also available at the top of the launcher to search though local content on the device or search online using the Bing search engine.
 "Library"

The OS features a multi-user system, which allows multiple people to setup and use separate user profiles.

Along with Amazon Kids and Amazon Kids+, a suite of parental controls is included which allows parents to create managed child profiles, set limits and set restrictions for minors.

Devices 

Current Amazon devices running Fire OS: 
 Fire Tablets - manufactured by Quanta Computer 
 Fire TV - manufactured by Foxconn
 Amazon Echo / Amazon Echo Show - manufactured by Amazon

Discontinued devices running Fire OS:
 Fire Phone - manufactured by Foxconn

List of Fire OS versions

The releases are categorized by major Fire OS versions based upon a certain Android codebase first and then sorted chronologically.

Fire OS 1 – based on Android 2.3 Gingerbread
 system version = 6.3.1
 system version = 6.3.2 – longer movie rentals, Amazon cloud synchronization
 system version = 6.3.4 – latest version for Kindle Fire (1st Generation) (2011)

Fire OS 2 – based on Android 4.0 Ice Cream Sandwich
 system version = 7.5.1 – latest version for Kindle Fire HD (2nd Generation) (7" 2012)
 system version = 8.5.1 – latest version for Kindle Fire HD 8.9" (2nd Generation) (2012)
 system version = 10.5.1 – latest version for Kindle Fire (2nd Generation) (2012)

Fire OS 2.4 – based on Android 4.0.3(?)

Fire OS 3 Mojito – based on Android 4.2 Jelly Bean
 3.1
 3.2.8 – rollback point for Kindle Fire HDX (2013)
 3.5.0 – introduces support for Fire Phone; Android 4.2.2 codebase
 3.5.1 – Fire Phone maintenance version

Fire OS 4 Sangria – based on Android 4.4 KitKat
 4.1.1
 4.5.5.1
 4.5.5.2
 4.5.5.3 – latest version for some tablets released in 2013, Kindle Fire HDX (3rd Generation), Kindle Fire HDX 8.9" (3rd Generation), Kindle Fire HD (3rd Generation)
 4.5.5.5 – latest version for some tablets released in 2013 (e.g. some Kindle Fire tablets of 3rd Generation)
 4.6.6.0 – Fire Phone
 4.6.6.1 – latest version for the Fire Phone

Fire OS 5 Bellini – based on Android 5.1.1 Lollipop
 5.0
 5.0.5.1 – introduction of Fire TV
 5.0.1
 5.1.1
 5.1.2
 5.1.2.1
 5.1.4
 5.2.1.0 – Fire TV devices
 5.2.1.1 
 5.2.1.2
 5.2.4.0
 5.2.6.0
 5.2.6.1
 5.2.6.2
5.2.8.4
 5.3.1.0
 5.3.1.1 – August 2016
 5.3.2.0 – November 2016
 5.3.2.1 – December 2016
 5.3.3.0 – March 2017
 5.3.6.4 – version for Fire HD 8 (6th Generation)
 5.3.6.8
 5.3.7.0
 5.3.7.1
 5.3.7.2 – for Fire HD 8 & Fire HD 10 (7th Generation)
 5.4.0.0 – June 2017
 5.4.0.1 – August 2017
 5.5.0.0 – November 2017: Only for Fire HD 10 (2017) with hands-free Alexa
 5.6.0.0 – November 2017
 5.6.0.1 – January 2018
 5.6.1.0 – March 2018: version for tablets released in 2014 (e.g. some Fire tablets of 4th Generation)
 5.6.2.0 – July 2018: Hands-Free Alexa For Fire 7 & HD 8 (2017) only
 5.6.2.3 – April 2018: Latest version for first and second generation Fire TV devices
 5.6.3.0 – November 2018: for Fire 7 (5th to 7th Generation); Due to a mistake, this version was accidentally released as 5.3.6.4 on some Fire tablets instead of 5.6.3.0, but includes the same update features.
 5.6.3.8 – April 2019
 5.6.4.0 – May 2019, September 2019: for Fire HD 8
 5.6.6.0 – May 2020
 5.6.7.0 – August 2020
 5.6.8.0 – November 2020: Latest version for Fire (5th Generation), Fire HD 6 (4th Generation), Fire HD 7 (4th Generation), Fire HD 8 (5th and 6th Generation), and Fire HD 10 (5th Generation)
 5.6.9.0 - December 2020
 5.7.0.0 – February 2022: Latest version for Fire HDX 8.9 (4th Generation), Fire (7th Generation), Fire HD 8 (7th Generation), and Fire HD 10 (7th Generation)
 5.8.6.8 – July 2019
 5.8.7.9 – August 2019
 5.7.8.2 – September 2019

Fire OS 6 – based on Android 7.1.2 Nougat
 6.2.1.0 – October 2017, released on third generation Fire TV
 6.2.1.2 – December 2017
 6.2.1.3 – May 2018
 6.3.0.1 – November 2018
 6.3.1.2 – July 2019: version for Fire 7 (9th Generation)
 6.3.1.3 (information needed)
 6.3.1.4 (information needed)
 6.3.1.5 – September 2019: last version of FireOS 6 for Fire HD 8 (8th generation) 
 6.5.3.4 – September 2019: Last version for Fire 7 (7th generation)
 6.5.3.5 – November 2019

Fire OS 7 – based on Android 9.0 Pie
 7.3.1.0 – October 2019: First version for Fire HD 10 (9th Generation)
 7.3.1.1 – October 2019: Second version for Fire HD 10 (9th Generation)
 7.3.1.2 – February 2020: Third version for Fire HD 10 (9th Generation)
 7.3.1.3 – April 2020: Fourth version for Fire HD 10 (9th Generation)
 7.3.1.4 – June 2020: Fifth version for Fire HD 10 (9th Generation)
 7.3.1.5 – August 2020: First version of FireOS 7 for Fire HD 8 (8th Generation)
 7.3.1.6 – October 2020
 7.3.1.7 – November 2020
 7.3.1.8 – February 2021
 7.3.1.9 – May 2021
 7.3.2.1 – September 2021
 7.3.2.2 – November 2021
 7.3.2.3 – May 2022
 7.3.2.4 – August 2022
 7.3.2.6 – November 2022
 7.3.2.7 - February 2023 Latest version for 8th, 9th, 10th and 11th Generation Fire Tablets

Fire OS 8 - based on Android 11 (Red Velvet Cake  )
 8.3.1.0  - June? 2022: Included on some 12th Gen Fire 7 units out of the box
 8.3.1.1 – June 28, 2022: Known first version for the 12th Generation Fire 7
 8.3.1.2 - September?, 2022
 8.3.1.3 - November 26, 2022
 8.3.1.4 - March 7, 2023: Latest version for 12th Generation Fire Tablets

Notes

See also
 Nokia X software platform, a similar fork by Nokia
 Tizen, a Linux-based OS by Samsung Electronics with an optional Android runtime
 Sailfish OS, a Linux-based mobile OS by Jolla which includes an Android runtime
 BlackBerry 10, a QNX-based mobile OS by BlackBerry which includes an Android runtime and comes with the Amazon Appstore preloaded
 Comparison of mobile operating systems

References

External links
 

Amazon (company)
Android (operating system)
Android forks
ARM operating systems
Mobile operating systems
Tablet operating systems